The 2022 PokerGO Cup was the second iteration of the PokerGO Cup, a series of high-stakes poker tournaments as part of the PokerGO Tour. It was held from inside the PokerGO Studio at Aria Resort & Casino in Las Vegas, Nevada. The series took place from February 2–10, 2022, with eight scheduled events culminating in a $100,000 No-Limit Hold'em tournament.

The player who earns the most points throughout the series would be crowned the PokerGO Cup champion earning the PokerGO Cup.

The Main Event was won by Sean Perry, and the PokerGO Cup was awarded to Jeremy Ausmus.

Schedule

Series leaderboard 
The 2022 PokerGO Cup will award the PokerGO Cup to the player that accumulates the most PokerGO Tour points during the series. American Jeremy Ausmus won one event and cashed four times on his way to accumulating $824,500 in winnings. Ausmus accumulated 658 points and was awarded the PokerGO Cup.

Results

Event #1: $10,000 No-Limit Hold'em 

 2-Day Event: February 2–3
 Number of Entries: 77
 Total Prize Pool: $770,000
 Number of Payouts: 11
 Winning Hand:

Event #2: $10,000 No-Limit Hold'em 

 2-Day Event: February 3–4
 Number of Entries: 80
 Total Prize Pool: $800,000
 Number of Payouts: 12
 Winning Hand:

Event #3: $10,000 No-Limit Hold'em 

 2-Day Event: February 4–5
 Number of Entries: 80
 Total Prize Pool: $800,000
 Number of Payouts: 12
 Winning Hand:

Event #4: $15,000 No-Limit Hold'em 

 2-Day Event: February 5–6
 Number of Entries: 65
 Total Prize Pool: $975,000
 Number of Payouts: 10
 Winning Hand:

Event #5: $25,000 No-Limit Hold'em 

 2-Day Event: February 6–7
 Number of Entries: 41
 Total Prize Pool: $1,025,000
 Number of Payouts: 6
 Winning Hand:

Event #6: $25,000 No-Limit Hold'em 

 2-Day Event: February 7–8
 Number of Entries: 35
 Total Prize Pool: $875,000
 Number of Payouts: 5
 Winning Hand:

Event #7: $25,000 No-Limit Hold'em 

 2-Day Event: February 8–9
 Number of Entries: 43
 Total Prize Pool: $1,075,000
 Number of Payouts: 7
 Winning Hand:

Event #8: $50,000 No-Limit Hold'em 

 2-Day Event: February 9–10
 Number of Entries: 32
 Total Prize Pool: $1,600,000
 Number of Payouts: 5
 Winning Hand:

References

External links 

 Results

2022 in sports in Nevada
Television shows about poker
Poker tournaments
2022 in poker